Mark Timothy Pittman (born 1975) is a United States district judge of the United States District Court for the Northern District of Texas and former judge of the Texas Court of Appeals.

Early life and education 

Pittman was born in Big Spring, Texas. He received his Bachelor of Arts, magna cum laude, from Texas A&M University and his Juris Doctor from The University of Texas School of Law.

Legal career 

After graduating from law school, Pittman clerked for Judge Eldon Brooks Mahon of the United States District Court for the Northern District of Texas. He then worked as an associate at Kelly, Hart & Hallman LLP. From 2004 to 2007, Pittman was a trial attorney in the Commercial Litigation Branch of the United States Department of Justice Civil Division. Pittman then served as an Assistant United States Attorney for the Northern District of Texas. Pittman later worked as a Senior Attorney at the Federal Deposit Insurance Corporation. Before becoming a judge, Pittman was an enforcement attorney with the United States Securities and Exchange Commission in Fort Worth.

Judicial career

State judicial service 

Pittman was a judge on the State's 352nd District Court, based in Fort Worth, Texas. In 2017, he was appointed by Governor Greg Abbott to be a justice of Texas's Second Court of Appeals. He served in that capacity until he was appointed a federal judge in 2019.

Federal judicial service 

On January 16, 2019, President Donald Trump announced his intent to nominate Pittman to serve as a United States district judge for the United States District Court for the Northern District of Texas. On January 17, 2019, his nomination was sent to the Senate. President Trump nominated Pittman to a seat vacated by John H. McBryde, who assumed senior status on October 9, 2018. On March 5, 2019, a hearing on his nomination was held before the Senate Judiciary Committee. On April 4, 2019, his nomination was reported out of committee by a 12–10 vote. On July 30, 2019, the Senate voted 54–34 to invoke cloture on his nomination. On July 31, 2019, his nomination was confirmed by a 54–36 vote. He received his judicial commission on August 5, 2019.

Notable rulings 

On November 8, 2021, Pittman ruled that United Airlines can impose a COVID-19 vaccine mandate on its employees while only providing unpaid leave for exempted workers.

On January 6, 2022, Pittman ordered the U.S. Food and Drug Administration (FDA) to review, redact, and release data submitted by COVID-19 vaccine manufacturer Pfizer for authorized use of the vaccine at an unprecedented rate. The data came from a Freedom of Information Act request submitted to FDA for documents beyond what was already publicly available on FDA's website as part of the approved vaccine's Action Package. Although the pace of the scheduling order required FDA to hire an additional team of contractors and expend roughly $5 million solely to comply with this FOIA request, Pittman ordered FDA to release documents at a faster pace, including at least 55,000 pages some months and at least 80,000 pages other months.

On November 10, 2022, Pittman ruled that the Biden administration did not have the authority to forgive student loan debt through executive action through the HEROES Act.

Memberships 

He is a member of the State Bar of Texas, Tarrant County Bar Association, Texas Bar Foundation, and the American Judges Association. He is vice president and a founding member of the Tarrant County Federalist Society.

References

External links 
 
 

|-

|-

1975 births
Living people
20th-century American lawyers
21st-century American lawyers
21st-century American judges
Assistant United States Attorneys
Federalist Society members
Judges of the United States District Court for the Northern District of Texas
People from Big Spring, Texas
Texas A&M University alumni
Texas A&M University faculty
Texas state court judges
U.S. Securities and Exchange Commission personnel
United States Department of Justice lawyers
United States district court judges appointed by Donald Trump
University of Texas School of Law alumni